Nadine Girault (May 2, 1959 – February 12, 2023) was a Canadian politician, who was elected to the National Assembly of Quebec in the 2018 provincial election. She represented the electoral district of Bertrand as a member of the Coalition Avenir Québec. She was a member of cabinet as Minister of International Relations and La Francophonie and Minister Responsible for the Laurentides Region. She stood down at the 2022 Quebec general election.

Girault died on February 12, 2023, at the age of 63, having suffered from lung cancer for over three years.

References

1959 births
2023 deaths
Coalition Avenir Québec MNAs
21st-century Canadian politicians
People from Laurentides
Black Canadian politicians
Black Canadian women
Members of the Executive Council of Quebec
Women government ministers of Canada
Women MNAs in Quebec
21st-century Canadian women politicians
Female foreign ministers